SAIPA (SAIPA) is an Iranian automaker headquartered in Tehran. The SAIPAC (an acronym for the French Société anonyme iranienne de production des automobiles Citroën) was established in 1965 as with 75% Iranian ownership, to assemble Citroëns under license for the Iranian market. It changed its name into SAIPA (Société anonyme iranienne de production automobile) in 1975 when Citroën withdrew from the company. Its products in recent years have been mostly under-licensed Korean cars and its own engine and range of cars. The chief executive (president or managing director) of SAIPA is Mohammadali Teimouri.

The main subsidiaries of SAIPA Group are Saipa Diesel, Pars Khodro and Zamyad Co.

History
SAIPA began by assembling Citroën's two-cylinder mini car, the Dyane, in 1968. It went under the name Jyane (or Jian) in Iran. SAIPA built 120,000 Jyane models.

There was also a glazed panel van version of the Jyane, as well as the Baby-Brousse, a rustic little buggy in the style of a Citroën Méhari but with a metal body. Later, a pickup version of the Jyane also appeared. The Baby-Brousse was built from 1970 until 1979. In 1975 Saipa began manufacturing licensed versions of the original Renault 5 and later the Renault 21. Production of Citroëns ended in 1980.

From 1986 to 1998 SAIPA built the Z24 pickup, a license-built version of the 1970-1980 Nissan Junior with a 2.4-litre engine. In 1998 SAIPA took over the Zamyad company, which then undertook the production of the Z24. Since 2003, this truck has been sold under the Zamyad brand.

Renault 5 production ended in 1994 (Pars Khodro took over the production lines) and the 21 was discontinued in 1997. In 1993 a relationship with KIA began, and production of the Kia Pride commenced. SAIPA's Pride is marketed under the names Saba (saloon) and Nasim (hatchback). At the 2001 Tehran Motor Show the liftback Saipa 141 was added to the lineup. This is a five-door version based on the Saba and is somewhat longer than the Nasim. The Pride series cars carry 97% local content. From 2001 to late 2010, SAIPA produced the Citroën Xantia under license. Sedan models of the previous generation Kia Rio were assembled using parts imported from Korea from May 2005 to late 2012, when SAIPA lost its license to produce them.

In 2000, SAIPA launched its own design, the 701 Caravan minivan, face-lifted in 2003.

In 2002, a lift-back version of the Saba was introduced as the 141.  Models 132 debuted in 2007 and 111 in 2009. The Iran-made "SAIPA National Engine 231" was introduced in November 2008.

In December 2008, the Tiba/Miniator debuted the Tiba with a 4-cylinder gas engine and ABS, averaging 7 liters of gasoline per 100 kilometers and putting out  with a displacement of 1,500 cc. The price quoted at the time of its launch was less than 100 million rials (US$10,000). The car was designed in country and produced with the services of some 122 local manufacturers. 15,000 Tiba were to be produced in 2009. Production over the succeeding three years was to reach 200,000 per year by a new subsidiary, Kashan SAIPA. The Tiba is expected to replace the Kia Pride. The share of Tiba/Miniator in SAIPA's exports will be about 20 percent by 2011.< The model was originally named Miniator but was later changed to Tiba (gazelle).

In 2012, a pick-up version of the SAIPA Pride was introduced as the 151. Its engine outputs roughly 68 hp and is capable of carrying 460 kg (380 kg with the LPG engine).

A hatchback version of the Tiba (211) was unveiled in 2013 with production beginning in 2014.

In 2015, the company began the production of cars derived from Chinese manufacturers. In June 2018, exports of Hirkani and SP100 to India began.

Pars Khodro acquisition 

In 2000, SAIPA purchased 51% of Pars Khodro, where it manufactured the Citroën C5.

Since 2018, Pars Khodro has mainly assembled a range of Chinese models, but other products include the SAIPA Renault Pars Tondar, an updated locally built version of the first-generation Dacia Logan, which used to be assembled by SAIPA and its subsidiary Pars Khodro in a joint venture with Renault (Dacia's parent company). Originally known as the Renault Tondar 90, the company received over 100,000 orders for the car within a week of it going on sale in March 2007.

Production was launched in Venezuela in 2006 and in Syria in 2007.

Models

Historic

 Citroën 2CV
 Citroën Jyane 602
 Saipa 141
 Changan Eado
 Pars Khodro V5
 Kia Rio
 Renault Megane
 Nissan New Murano
 Nissan Teana
 Dongfeng Rich
 Nissan Roniz
 Zamyad Shooka
 Citroën Xantia
 Kia Pride 
 Pars Khodro Sepand
 Nissan Patrol
 Pars Khodro New Sepand
Sherkat Sakami Jeep CJ
Aria and Shahin
Sherkat Sakami Jeep Ahoo and Simorgh
Opel Commodore
Chevrolet Iran
Chevrolet Nova
Buick Iran
Sherkat Sakami Jeep Gladiator
Cadillac Iran
Saipa Caravan
Jeep Sahra
Citroën C3

Current

Other Models
Kia Cerato
Kia Forte
Renault Sandero Stepway
Jinbei Haise
Dongfeng Rich
Zamyad Padra
Iveco Azar Minibus

See also
SAIPA Diesel
SAIPA Glass
IDRO
Automotive industry in Iran
Zamyad Co.
Pars Khodro

References

External links

Saipa Official Website
Saipa Official English Website
Saipa Official page on Instagram
Saipa Official page on Facebook

Car manufacturers of Iran
Vehicle manufacturing companies established in 1966
Companies listed on the Tehran Stock Exchange
Iranian brands
Motor vehicle engine manufacturers
Engine manufacturers of Iran
Manufacturing companies based in Tehran
Iranian companies established in 1966